John Bates may refer to:

Sportspeople
John Bates (American football) (born 1997), American football player
John Bates (baseball) (1868–1919), American baseball player
Johnny Bates (baseball) (1882–1949), American baseball player
John Bates (basketball) (1938–2015), American college basketball coach

Other people
John Bates (technology executive), British computer scientist and businessman
John Bates (designer) (1935–2022), English fashion designer
John C. Bates (1842–1919), U.S. general and army chief of staff 1906
John L. Bates (1859–1946), U.S. political figure and governor of Massachusetts 1903–1905
John D. Bates (born 1946), federal judge appointed by George W. Bush
John Bates (rector), eighteenth-century Senior Wrangler; see List of Wranglers of the University of Cambridge
Big John Bates, Canadian guitarist and singer
John Bates (neurophysiologist) (1918–1993), English neurophysiologist
John Grenville Bates (1880–1944), co-founder of the American Kennel Club

Fictional characters
John Bates, a character from the period drama soap opera Downton Abbey
Johnny Bates, alter ego of Kid Marvelman

See also
John Bates Clark (1847–1938), American economist
John Bates Thurston (1836–1897), British colonial in Fiji
Jonathan Bates (1939–2008), English sound editor
John Bate (disambiguation)